"Johnny, Johnny Come Home" is a 1989 song recorded by Norwegian band Avalanche. It was their debut single and can be considered as its signature song. Released in March 1989 it helped launch the band's career achieving a smash success in France where it topped the chart and also in Norway was a top three hit, but its sales remained minimal in other countries.

Background and release
Written by Vinton Hoover and Avalanche's member Kjetil Rosnes, "Johnny Johnny Come Home" was published twice: first in late 1988, with a red cover single, then in March 1989 with a blue one containing a new remix. The refrain is composed of the title repeated eight times and many onomatopoeias ("Na na na na na na na na na na na na na na na"). Two songs with almost the same title, "Johnny Come Home", by Fine Young Cannibals in 1985, then by The Men They Couldn't Hang in 1987, are not related to Avalanche's one.

Chart performance
In France, "Johnny, Johnny Come Home" debuted at number 43 on the chart edition of 1 April 1989, and climbed regularly until reaching the top ten in its sixth week. It topped the chart from it tenth week and remained there for eight consecutive weeks before being dislodged by Kaoma's massive summer hit "Lambada"; then it almost did not stop to drop and totaled 17 weeks in the top ten and 26 weeks in the top 50. In Norway, the song was ranked in the top ten for eleven weeks from the 27th week of 1989, including a peak at number three in its sixth week. The song was also released in Germany, but failed to reach the chart. On the European Hot 100 Singles, it debuted at number 98 on 28 April 1989, reached number two in its 15th week, and spent 23 weeks on the chart, eight of them in the top ten.

Track listings

 7" single - France, Germany
 "Johnny, Johnny Come Home" — 4:14
 "Johnny, Johnny Come Home" (dance mix) — 4:03

 CD single - Germany
 "Johnny, Johnny Come Home" — 8:38
 "Johnny, Johnny Come Home" (single version) — 4:14
 "Johnny, Johnny Come Home" (dance mix) — 4:03

 12" maxi - Germany
 "Johnny, Johnny Come Home" — 8:38
 "Johnny, Johnny Come Home" (dub, instrumental version) — 3:35
 "Johnny, Johnny Come Home" (dance mix) — 4:03

 12" maxi - New mix 1989 summer - France
 "Johnny, Johnny Come Home" (special version) — 9:20
 "Johnny, Johnny Come Home" (special radio edit) — 4:14
 "Return of Johnny" (instrumental) — 4:04

Versions
 Radio Edit
 Dance mix
 Dub instrumental version
 Special version
 Special radio edit
 New mix

Credits
 Arranged by Kjetil Rosnes
 Programmed and engineered by Joey Wild
 Mixed by Frankie Rynke
 Producerd by Vinton Hoover
 Cover : F.Gaillard

Charts and sales

Weekly charts

Year-end charts

Certifications

See also
 List of number-one hits of 1989 (France)

References

1988 songs
1989 debut singles
SNEP Top Singles number-one singles
Avalanche (band) songs
Warner Records singles